The Lichtenstein Cave, discovered in 1972, is an archaeological cave site near Dorste, Lower Saxony, Germany with a length of . The skeletal remains of 21 female humans and 19 males, dated to the Bronze Age, about 3,000 years ago were discovered. In addition, around 100 bronze objects (ear rings, bracelets, and finger rings) and ceramic parts from the Urnfield Culture were found.

Ancient DNA Tests

Both mitochondrial DNA and Y-chromosome DNA tests were conducted on the skeletons and published by the University of Göttingen.  Mitochondrial haplogroups found included 17 from H, 5 from T2, 9 from U5b and 5 from J*. Out of the 19 males represented in the cave, 15 yielded the full 12 tested STR values, with twelve showing haplotypes related to I2b2 (at least four lineages),  two to R1a (probably one lineage), and one to R1b predicted haplogroups. Y-STR results are given in the table below:

() = allele unsure or assignment of an individual, nd = not determined

See also
Ancient DNA

References

External links
 Lichtenstein Cave Data Analysis.  D. Schweitzer, Ph.D.
 Two Germans Share World's Longest Family Tree
 Human sacrifice was rarer than thought

DNA
Prehistoric sites in Germany
Genetic genealogy
Caves of Germany
Geography of Lower Saxony
Landforms of Lower Saxony